Silica is an unincorporated community in southwestern Pioneer Township, Rice County, Kansas, United States.

History
For millennia, the land now known as Kansas was inhabited by Native Americans.  In 1803, most of modern Kansas was secured by the United States as part of the Louisiana Purchase.  In 1854, the Kansas Territory was organized, then in 1861 Kansas became the 34th U.S. state.  In 1867, Rice County was founded.

Silica had a post office from 1893 until 1953.

Education
The community is served by Chase–Raymond USD 401 public school district.

References

Further reading

External links
 Rice County maps: Current, Historic - KDOT

Unincorporated communities in Kansas
Unincorporated communities in Rice County, Kansas